Ice melting may refer to:

Ice melt
Retreat of glaciers since 1850
Arctic sea ice decline